Leverage is a 2019 South Korean television series starring Lee Dong-gun, Jeon Hye-bin, Kim Sae-ron, Kim Kwon and Yeo Hoe-hyun. It is a remake of the American TV series of the same name. It aired on TV Chosun from October 13 to December 8, 2019.

Synopsis
The series follows the story of Lee Tae-joon, a former insurance investigator who forms a team of thieves and con artists to target the rich and wealthy. The team was also formed to avenge Tae-joon's son's death.

Cast

Main
 Lee Dong-gun as Lee Tae-joon, a former principled elite insurance investigator who was once viewed as "Grim Reaper of con artists".
 Jeon Hye-bin as Hwang Soo-kyung, an untalented actress, but a top scammer who is able to speak four languages fluently.
 Kim Sae-ron as Go Na-byul, a former fencing national athlete turned into a top class thief who uses her quick and flexible movements to help swindle people and sneak into places.
 Kim Kwon as Roy Ryu, a security specialist who became a mercenary specializing in various forms of martial arts.
 Yeo Hoe-hyun as Jeong Eui-sung, a hacker who has great digital skills, especially in computers, mobile phones and CCTV.

Supporting
 Choi Ja-hye as Shin Yu-ri, Tae-joon's wife.
 Park Eun-seok as Min Young-min

Others 
 Hong Seung-hee as Yoo-jin
 Gu Ja-geon as a bodyguard

Special appearances 
 Choi Dae-chul as Jeong Han-gu
 Lee Yong-woo as "Ghost Agent" ( 5–6)
 Jang Gwang as Baek Jong-goo (Ep. 7–8)

Production
The first script reading was held in August 2019 in Yeouido, Seoul, South Korea.

Ratings

Notes

References

External links
  
 
 

Leverage (TV series)
Korean-language television shows
2019 South Korean television series debuts
2019 South Korean television series endings
TV Chosun television dramas
South Korean crime television series
South Korean television series based on American television series
Television series by Sony Pictures Television
Fraud in television